Ned Sublette (born 1951 in Lubbock, Texas) is an American composer, musician, record producer, musicologist, historian, and author.  Sublette studied Spanish Classical Guitar with Hector Garcia at the University of New Mexico and with Emilio Pujol in Spain. He studied composition with Kenneth Gaburo at the University of California, San Diego.  He grew up in Portales, New Mexico, moved to New York City in 1976, and has worked with John Cage, LaMonte Young, Glenn Branca, and Peter Gordon.

Music performance

As a performer, Sublette is probably best known for fusing country-western and afro-Caribbean styles including salsa, cumbia and rumba, as reflected on the 1999 album "Cowboy Rumba", as well as his 2012 second album Kiss You Down South. He is also a leading scholar of Cuban music. His label Qbadisc releases Cuban music in the United States and he has released music by Latin musicians including Ritmo Oriental and Issac Delgado and has co-produced Public Radio International's "Afropop Worldwide" show.

During the 1980s, he led the Ned Sublette Band, which played country with Cuban stylings. His "Cowboy Rumba" reached number one on World Music Charts Europe during December, 1999. In 2006, Willie Nelson released Sublette's song "Cowboys Are Frequently, Secretly Fond of Each Other" in the wake of the success of Brokeback Mountain. He also performed an experimental radio "mash-up" in 1984 for the "Art on the Beach" series.

Writing

His book on Cuban music, Cuba and Its Music: From the First Drums to the Mambo was published in 2004. The World That Made New Orleans: From Spanish Silver to Congo Square, was published in 2008 by Lawrence Hill Books. The Year Before the Flood: A Story of New Orleans  published in 2009 by Lawrence Hill Books continues the history of New Orleans cultures and music.

Awards

Sublette is a 2005 Guggenheim Fellow. In 2012 he was a Knight-Luce Fellow for Reporting on Global Religion at the University of Southern California.  He did research in Angola, which resulted in a four-episode Hip Deep Angola radio series, produced for the public radio program Afropop Worldwide.

Other works

Sublette starred in Vidas Perfectas, a Spanish-language version of Robert Ashley's 1983 "television opera" Perfect Lives, which premiered on stage at Irondale Theater, Brooklyn in December 2011, and which was to be shot for television in 2012.

In October 2015, Sublette and his wife Constance published The American Slave Coast: A History of the Slave-Breeding Industry, a comprehensive history of slave trading in the southern colonies and states.

Discography
Ships at Sea, Sailors and Shoes (Excellent, 1993)
Monsters from the Deep (Excellent, 1997)
Cowboy Rumba (Palm Pictures, 1999)
Kiss You Down South (Postmambo, 2012)

References

External links

 
 
 Interview with Ned Sublette on Cuban music, WNYC, January 2009
  Interview with Ned Sublette by Prof. Joseph Roach of Yale University, 2005
 Interview with Ned Sublette by Prof. Vicki Mayer of Tulane University, 2005
  Interview with Ned Sublette by Garnette Cadogan in Bomb, Summer 2009, on New Orleans music, Mardi Gras, and history
  Ned Sublette performs songs at The Kitchen in New York City, June, 2006
  Review of The Year Before the Flood by Ingrid Norton

1951 births
American country singer-songwriters
People from Lubbock, Texas
Living people
People from Portales, New Mexico
Singer-songwriters from Texas
Songwriters from New Mexico
American Book Award winners
Country musicians from Texas